Out of the Ashes is a 2003 American made-for-television biographical drama film that was released by Showtime.  It is a dramatization of the life of Holocaust concentration camp survivor Gisella Perl and is based on her book I Was a Doctor in Auschwitz. The film is dedicated to the memory of Richard Crenna, who died three months before it was released.

Plot
Gisella Perl, a Jewish-Hungarian gynecologist from Sighetul Marmatiei, Romania, testifies before an Immigration & Naturalization Service (INS) review board consisting of three men. Perl is seeking to be granted citizenship after passing the New York State Medical Licensing Board examinations, wishing to begin practicing in New York. She recounts her early life when she aspired to be a doctor despite the admonishments of her father, her time practicing as a gynecologist before the German invasion, and her experiences as prisoner #25404, where she provided what medical care she could to fellow prisoners. Her most controversial actions included providing late-term abortions to pregnant women in order to save their lives. These pregnant women would otherwise have been killed immediately or subjected to the torture of horrific "medical" experiments.

Perl is accused of "colluding" with the Nazi doctor Josef Mengele who directed experiments on pregnant female inmates at the Auschwitz concentration camp.  As the review board questions her over several days, she becomes increasingly emotional and questions her own determination to survive, as well as her guilt at having lived while so many others did not. She testifies that despite her intention to keep herself and others alive, she unknowingly became part of the Nazi efforts to kill, but she held on to the hope that the lives of the women she saved would undermine the efforts of the Nazis to exterminate the Jewish race. After she is granted citizenship and begins to practice in New York, she gets a call to attend one of the women whose first baby she had aborted in the camp. She delivers the baby and sees her wish that the Jewish race will survive fulfilled.

Cast 

Christine Lahti as Gisella Perl
Beau Bridges as Herman Prentiss
Richard Crenna as Jake Smith
Bruce Davison as Peter Schuman
Jonathan Cake as Dr. Mengele
Zoie Palmer as Didi Goldstein
Jolyon Baker as Frederick Krauss
Jessica Beitchman as Marta Weiss
Oliver Cotton as Moshe Perl
Michelle Fine as Fanny Perl
Maria Ricossa as Esther Jacob
Ingrid Veninger as Zozia
Emma Wellbelove as Young Gisella
Nina Young as Irma Grese
 as David Perl
Inga Tuminiene as Cilla Perl
Adrija Cepaite-Palsauskiene as Rose Perl
Inga Maskarina as Helen Perl
Nola Augustson as Sarah Goldstein
Alan Jordan as Isaac Goldstein
Judah Katz as Dr. Jonas Ruben
Monika Biciunaite as Dr. Ruth Stern
Viola Kilimciauskaite as Katya Weiss
Kristina Mauruseviciute as Leitu
Getter Kosolov as Young Cilla Perl
Aurelija Pasmuntaite as Young Rose Perl
Joonas Suokko as Young David Perl
Elena Stonciute as Young Helen Perl
Sara Jessica Karimjee as Hannah Mary Lal

References

External links 
 
 
 

2003 television films
2003 films
American biographical drama films
2003 biographical drama films
Films based on biographies
Films about the aftermath of the Holocaust
Showtime (TV network) films
Films directed by Joseph Sargent
Films scored by Charles Bernstein
Cultural depictions of Josef Mengele
2003 drama films
American drama television films
2000s American films